Why Russia is not  America is a book by Andrei Parshev, a Russian writer and former colonel of the Russian Federal Border Service. It was published in 1999.

The work is dedicated to proving that due to the peculiarities of Russia (harsh climate and long distances), the applied liberal model of market reforms is unsuitable for the country, and their continuation will lead to the extinction of a significant part of the population and the collapse of the country. According to Parshev, he wanted to name his work “The book for those who stay here”, but the publisher insisted on the current title.

The authors of the book The Siberian Curse Fiona Hill and Clifford G. Gaddy highly praised the book by Parshev and his description of the shortcomings of the cold climate. However, they think he is mistaken in this main conclusion that the Russian cold is a defining characteristic of the country’s economy.

Notes

References 
 Боровский Б. И. Моделирование влияния географических характеристик территории страны на энергетическую эффективность её экономики // Строительство и техногенная безопасность: сборник научных трудов НАПКС. Вып.41 : Геометрическое и компьютерное моделирование: энергосбережение, экология, дизайн" : доклады девятой международной крымской научно-практической конференции / гл. ред. Э. Ф. Панюков. — Симферополь : Национальная академия природоохранного и курортного строительства, 2012. — С. 51-54. — 271 с. 
 
 Смирнов И. Ю. А чем Россия не Нигерия?. — М.: Фонд «Либеральная миссия», 2006. — 308 с. ISBN 5-903135-02-1
 Цирель С. В. Миф о дефектности русской природы. Запоздалая рецензия на книгу А. П. Паршева «Почему Россия не Америка».

Economy of Russia
Economics books
Books about Russia
1999 non-fiction books